Julia Dorsey (1850–1919) was an African American suffragist.

She and her husband, Ignatius Dorsey, were African American signers of an 1877 petition in Washington D.C. calling for women's suffrage. Other signers of the petition included Frederick Douglass, Jr. and his wife, and his sister, Rosetta Douglass Sprague, and her husband Nathan Sprague.

Early life 
Dorsey, whose maiden name is unknown, was born in Maryland in 1850. She married Ignatius Dorsey and together they lived in Hillsdale in Washington, DC. The Dorseys were listed among the "first Settlers of Barry Farm" with a lot on Sumner Ave. in Hillsdale. In 1880 Ignatius Dorsey purchased a lot of land on nearby Nicholas Avenue for $200 and built a two-story house. The couple had no children at this date; Julia Dorsey was recorded as keeping house, while her husband worked as a laborer.

Becoming a suffragist  
The Dorseys befriended the Douglass family in the Hillsdale neighborhood, now Anacostia, and came to support the woman suffrage movement. An associated petition drive organized by the National Woman Suffrage Association called for a constitutional amendment that would give women the right to vote.

Later life
Julia and Ignatius Dorsey are not seen in the 1900 census, but she was a 62-year-old widow in D.C. in 1910, renting rooms to five Black lodgers. Julia Dorsey died in February 1919 at age 68 at her home on 569 Stanton Road in Anacostia.

References

Sources 
 Petition for Woman Suffrage from Colored Men and Colored Women, Residents of the District of Columbia, ca. 1877
 Williams, Lea Esther. Servants of the People: The 1960s Legacy of African American Leadership. New York: St. Martin's Press, 1996.
 Federal manuscript censuses of the District of Columbia, 1880 and 1910. Accessed via HeritageQuest.com.
 "Real Estate Estate Transfers." The Washington Post. June 1, 1880. page 3.
 "List of First Settlers of Barry Farm/Hillsdale, 1867–1871." 1981. History of Place research files, Anacostia Community Museum, Washington, D.C.
 Appendix A. Instructions to Enumerators Concerning the Return of Occupations at the Censuses of 1870, 1880, 1890, and 1900. page 2.
 "Deaths Reported." The Washington Post. February 15, 1919. page 12.

1850 births
1919 deaths
African-American suffragists
American suffragists
People from Maryland